Balch Springs Christian Academy (BSCA) is a private Christian school in Balch Springs, Texas in the Dallas-Fort Worth area serving grades K-12. It is a part of the Seagoville Road Baptist Church.

References

External links
 Balch Springs Christian Academy
 Balch Springs Christian Academy (Archive)

Christian schools in Texas
Private K-12 schools in Dallas County, Texas
Schools in Dallas County, Texas